Richard John Carew Chartres, Baron Chartres , FBS (born 11 July 1947) is a retired bishop of the Church of England. He was area Bishop of Stepney from 1992 to 1995 and Bishop of London from 1995 to 2017. He was sworn of the Privy Council in the same year he became Bishop of London. He was also Gresham Professor of Divinity from 1987 to 1992. In October 2017, Chartres was made a life peer, and now sits in the House of Lords as a crossbencher; he had previously sat in the House as one of the Lords Spiritual.

Life

Early life
Chartres was born in Ware, Hertfordshire, to Richard Arthur Carew Chartres and Charlotte, daughter of William Day, of London; the Chartres family were Irish gentry of Huguenot origin. He was educated at Hertford Grammar School (now Richard Hale School) and Trinity College, Cambridge (MA), where he studied history before his theological studies at Cuddesdon and Lincoln theological colleges.

He has spoken of his great-uncle, John Chartres, "called [the] 'Mystery Man of the Treaty' was a member of Sinn Féin and a Protestant civil servant. He was also undoubtedly a gun runner for Michael Collins".

Priest
Chartres was ordained as a priest in 1974. During this time, he was chaplain to Robert Runcie, then Bishop of St Albans and later Archbishop of Canterbury. He received a Lambeth Bachelor of Divinity degree and holds honorary doctorates from Brunel University, City University London, London Metropolitan University, St. Mary's University College, and London Guildhall University.

Gresham professor
From 1987 to 1992, he was a Professor of Divinity at Gresham College in London. Based on a three-part lecture series, given in May 1992, he published A Brief History of Gresham College 1597–1997. During the first lecture of the original lecture series he referred to the college as a "magical island like Atlantis" disappearing and re-emerging from the sea. This was a reference both to the Invisible College and Francis Bacon's New Atlantis.

Other Gresham lectures by Chartres covered the Shroud of Turin (November 1988) and the Church of the Holy Sepulchre in Jerusalem (December 1989) when he spoke about the Gresham Jerusalem Project as well as on prayer (1991).

Bishop
On 15 May 1992, Chartres was nominated area Bishop of Stepney. He was consecrated as bishop on 22 May 1992 at St Paul's Cathedral, by George Carey, Archbishop of Canterbury.

In November 1995, Chartres was confirmed as the Bishop of London. He also became Prelate of the Order of the British Empire and Dean of the Chapel Royal.  He is a Privy Counsellor. In 1997 he was appointed a chaplain of the Most Venerable Order of Saint John (ChStJ). He is an Honorary Bencher of the Middle Temple, a Liveryman of the Merchant Taylors' Company and of the Worshipful Company of Vintners, an Honorary Freeman of the Weavers' and the Woolmen Companies.

In 1997, Chartres was one of the executors of the will of Diana, Princess of Wales, and delivered an address at her memorial service in 2007. He confirmed Prince William. On 12 September 2009 he presided at the marriage of Lord Frederick Windsor to actress Sophie Winkleman at the Chapel Royal in Hampton Court Palace.

Chartres is the founder and chairman of the trustees of the St Ethelburga's Centre for Reconciliation and Peace. He is also a trustee of Coexist, sitting on the advisory council of the Tony Blair Faith Foundation. In October 2005, he joined Marianne Suhr at St Giles in the Fields, London, to launch a new maintenance project for the capital's historic churches.

In January 2006, Chartres was criticised by the media for his decision to spend Easter on a cruise ship giving lectures on theology rather than attend the services at St Paul's Cathedral. At the time, Chartres was on a two-month sabbatical, his first in 33 years. He preached the sermon at the wedding of Prince William and Catherine Middleton on 29 April 2011. In 2013, Chartres led the state funeral service of Baroness Thatcher, with whom he had a close friendship.

Chartres is responsible for the Church of England's relations with the Orthodox churches, representing the Church of England at the funeral of Patriarch Alexy II of Moscow of the Russian Orthodox Church and the enthronement of his successor, Kirill I, in Moscow.

On 19 July 2016, it was announced that Chartres was to retire as Bishop of London effective from Shrove Tuesday, 28 February 2017, but remain as Dean of the Chapel Royal until the next Bishop of London was in post. He retired as dean following his 72nd birthday in July 2019.

Green issues
Since its launch in 2006, Chartres has led the Church of England's "shrinking the footprint" campaign, aimed at cutting 80% of the church's carbon emissions by 2050. In the launch and subsequently, Chartres criticised pollution of the planet by people going on holidays by plane. Michael O'Leary, boss of the low-cost airline Ryanair, responded that "the Bishop of London has got empty churches – presumably if no one went on holidays perhaps they might turn up and listen to his sermons. God bless the Bishop!" Also, after criticism that his taking flights for "diocese work" as well as retaining a chauffeur-driven car were against the ideals of this campaign, he pledged not to fly for a year.

In October 2008, the Independent on Sunday named Chartres as number 75 of the top 100 environmentalists in Britain on their "Green List".

Patronage
Chartres is an ambassador for wildlife charity WWF and a patron of various other organisations, including:
The Burgon Society for the study of academical dress (also a fellow) 
The Fellowship of Saint Alban and Saint Sergius
The Georgian Group
Paintings in Hospitals, a charity that provides art for health and social care in England, Wales and Northern Ireland
The Prayer Book Society of England (ecclesiastical patron) 
Prospex, a charity which works with young people in North London
St Paul's Theological Centre
The Tower Hamlets Friends & Neighbours, a charity which works with older people in East London
The Westminster Theological Centre
The Choral Foundation, Hampton Court Palace
The Nigerian Chaplaincy

Personal life
In 1982, Chartres married Caroline (daughter of Sir Alan McLintock), then a freelance writer and now the commissioning editor of a publishing house, with whom he has four children: Alexander, Sophie, Louis and Clio. He is also a member of the Garrick Club in London, and Worshipful Company of Drapers in the City of London.

Honours and awards
Chartres was appointed Knight Commander of the Royal Victorian Order (KCVO) in the 2009 Queen's Birthday Honours. He was raised to the rank of Knight Grand Cross of the Royal Victorian Order (GCVO) on his retirement as Dean of the Chapel Royal on 11 July 2019. As is customary for Church of England clergy, however, he did not use the style "Sir before his elevation to the peerage.

On 12 October 2017, it was announced that Chartres would be appointed a life peer, retaking a seat in the House of Lords where he previously served as one of the Lords Spiritual during his time as Bishop of London.  Chartres took the title "Baron Chartres, of Wilton in the County of Wiltshire", and joined the House of Lords on 7 November 2017, where he sits as a crossbencher.

Honours
: Knight Grand Cross of the Royal Victorian Order (GCVO) - 2019.
: Chaplain of the Order of St John (ChStJ)

Honorary degrees
Honorary DD degree from Queen Mary and Westfield College, University of London
Honorary DD degree from City University London: 19 May 1999  
Honorary DD degree from Brunel University: 1999  
Honorary DD degree from St Mary's University College (University of Surrey)
Honorary D.Litt degree from London Guildhall University
 Honorary Doctorate King's College London: 3 November 2010.

Fellowships
 Fellow of Trinity College, Cambridge: 2017. 
 Fellow of the Society of Antiquaries of London: 10 June 1999.
 Visiting Fellow of Nuffield College, Oxford.
 Honorary Fellow of King's College, Cambridge.
 Honorary Fellow of St. John's College, Cambridge.

Styles
 The Reverend Richard Chartres (1973–1986)
 The Reverend Professor Richard Chartres (1986–1992)
 The Right Reverend Richard Chartres (1992–1995)
 The Right Reverend and Right Honourable Richard Chartres (1995–2010)
 The Right Reverend and Right Honourable Richard Chartres, The Lord Bishop of London  (2010–2017)
 The Right Reverend and Right Honourable The Lord Chartres  (7 November 20172019)
 The Right Reverend and Right Honourable The Lord Chartres  (2019present)

References

External links
Biography on the Diocese of London's website
Interview at the World Economic Forum 2011 about faith and climate change
Information on the Debrett's People of Today website
Information on the British Parliament website

1947 births
Living people
Crossbench life peers
Life peers created by Elizabeth II
Ordained peers
People from Ware, Hertfordshire
20th-century Church of England bishops
21st-century Church of England bishops
People educated at Hertford Grammar School
Alumni of Lincoln Theological College
Alumni of Ripon College Cuddesdon
Alumni of Trinity College, Cambridge
Bishops of London
Bishops of Stepney
English Anglicans
Fellows of the Society of Antiquaries of London
Knights Grand Cross of the Royal Victorian Order
Members of the Privy Council of the United Kingdom
Professors of Gresham College
Prelates of the Order of the British Empire
Deans of the Chapel Royal
Chaplains of the Order of St John